The 2022 Super W season was the fifth edition of the Super W competition. The Fijiana Drua joined the five Super W teams for the 2022 season, and won the championship. The New South Wales Waratahs were the four-time, back-to-back defending champions.

Competition format
With six teams, each team played five regular season matches. The top three teams at the end of the regular season progressed to the finals. The second and third placed teams competed in a semi-final elimination round on April 14. The winner progressed to the Grand Final on April 24 and played the first placed team for the championship.

Competition

Ladder

Regular season

Round 1

Round 2

Round 3

Round 4
Bye round

Round 5

Round 6

Finals

Bracket

Semi-final

Final

Notes

References

2022
2022 in Australian rugby union
2022 in women's rugby union
2022 in Australian women's sport